Margaret Elizabeth Rowell Good (born August 23, 1976) is an American lawyer and politician from Florida. She served in the Florida House of Representatives from 2018 to 2020, representing the Sarasota area. She is a member of the Democratic Party.

Early life and career
Good grew up in Georgia and earned her bachelor's degree in German from the University of South Carolina and her master's degree from the University of Washington. She earned her Juris Doctor from the University of Florida School of Law and was an attorney with the law firm Eastmoore Crauwels & DuBose.

Political career
Good defeated Republican James Buchanan, son of Vern Buchanan, and Libertarian Alison Foxall in a special election on February 13, 2018, to fill a vacancy in the Florida House. Good was closely re-elected in the November 2018 general election, defeating former state representative Ray Pilon.

In 2019, Good announced her candidacy for Florida's 16th congressional district, which has been held by Vern Buchanan since 2007. She lost the election by 11%.

Electoral history

See also 
 Florida House of Representatives

References

External links

 Florida House of Representatives - Margaret Good
 Margaret Good for Congress campaign website

1976 births
Living people
People from Sarasota County, Florida
Florida lawyers
Women state legislators in Florida
Democratic Party members of the Florida House of Representatives
Place of birth missing (living people)
University of South Carolina alumni
Fredric G. Levin College of Law alumni
Candidates in the 2020 United States elections
21st-century American politicians
21st-century American women politicians